Magdalena Krukowska (born 1987) is a Polish sprint canoer who has competed since the late 2000s. She won a bronze medal in the K-4 500 m event at the 2010 ICF Canoe Sprint World Championships in Poznań.

References
2010 ICF Canoe Sprint World Championships women's K-4 500 m results. – accessed 22 August 2010.

Living people
Polish female canoeists
1987 births
Place of birth missing (living people)
ICF Canoe Sprint World Championships medalists in kayak